There have been a number of 18-inch torpedoes in service with the United States.  These have been used on ships and submarines of the US Navy.  American "18-inch" torpedoes were actually  in diameter, beginning with the "Fiume" Whitehead torpedo of 1890.

Ship classes that carried 18-inch torpedoes include:

Aylwin-class destroyers
B-class through some R-class submarines
Bainbridge-class destroyers
Cassin-class destroyers
Cincinnati-class cruisers
Columbia-class cruisers
Illinois-class battleships
Indiana-class battleships
Kearsarge-class battleships
Maine-class battleships
Montgomery-class cruisers
Paulding-class destroyers
Pennsylvania-class cruisers
Plunger-class submarines
Smith-class destroyers
Truxtun-class destroyers

See also
American 21-inch torpedo

External links
Torpedo history, part 2, Naval History & Heritage Command
Navweaps links: US Torpedoes main page, Pre-World War II, Post-World War II

Torpedoes
World War I naval weapons
World War II naval weapons
Torpedoes of the United States
Unmanned underwater vehicles